Itır Esen (born 17 December 1956) is a Turkish film actress. She is the daughter of film actor Hayri Esen. Her niece, also named Itır Esen, is a model.

Biography
Itır Esen was born in Istanbul on 17 December 1956 and started out as a fashion model for the newspaper Milliyet. She acted in a popular TV series called "Aşk-ı Memnu" and made her film debut in "Bizim Aile" opposite Tarık Akan. She is also known for Aile Şerefi, Gülen Gözler. 

She married Turkish film director Yavuz Turgul and retired from acting. In the 2000s (decade) she came out of retirement to occasionally act in supporting roles. She has two children.

Esen  is an avid fan of Beşiktaş J.K. and currently contributes as an online columnist to an online news website affiliated with the fans of the club.

Filmography

 Aşk-ı Memnu (1975)
 Bizim Aile (1975) 
 Gençlik Köprüsü (1975)
 Aile Şerefi (1976) 
 Gülen Gözler (1977)
 Benim Gibi Sevenler (1977) 
 Liseli Kızlar (1977) 
 Benim Gibi Sevenler (1977) 
 Cennetin Çocukları (1977) 
 Rezil (1978) 
 Yeditepe İstanbul (2001)
 Aliye (2004) 
 Çemberimde Gül Oya (2004)
 Alanya Almanya (2005) 
 Yeniden Çalıkuşu (2005)
 Arka Sokaklar (2006) 
 Ahh İstanbul (2006)
 Sis ve Gece (2006) 
 Sınav (2006)
 Doktorlar (2006)
 Pertev Bey'in Üç Kızı (2006)
 Kuzey Rüzgarı (2007)
 Milyonda Bir (2008)
 Güneşi Gördüm (2009)
 Adını Sen Koy (2009)
 Deli Saraylı (2010)
 Maskeli Balo (2010)
 Mavi Kelebekler (2012)
 Kurt Kanunu (2012)
 Taş Mektep (2012)
 Aşk Ağlatır  (2013)
 Fatih Harbiye  (2013)
 Peri Masalı  (2013)
 Gamsız Hayat  (2015)
 Kördüğüm  (2016)
 Bir Deli Sevda (2017)
 Annem (2019)
 Zümrüdüanka (2020)
 Saygı (2020)
 Kırmızı Oda (2021)
 Kuş Uçuşu (2023)

Notes

External links

1956 births
Actresses from Istanbul
People from Balıkesir
Living people
Turkish film actresses
Turkish television actresses
Turkish female models
20th-century Turkish actresses